The Cowtown Rodeo is a famous rodeo in the United States which started in 1929. The event is at 7:30 on Saturday nights from May through September. In 1957 and 1958, Cowtown was syndicated on national television. It is located in Pilesgrove Township, New Jersey and Woodstown, New Jersey. Grant Harris and his family have been running the rodeo every Saturday night during the summer months since 1955, when it was first staged as a weekly event.

References

External links

Tourist attractions in Salem County, New Jersey
Rodeo competition series
1929 establishments in New Jersey